Arlene's Grocery is a bar and music venue located in the Lower East Side district of Manhattan. It is located at 95 Stanton Street between Orchard St and Ludlow St. The venue was opened by Shane Doyle and two partners in 1995. Shane Doyle was also owner and founder of Sin-é. While Shane was bought out early on, the two remaining partners run the club.

History
The former Puerto Rican bodega/grocery store (the facade of which remains) and neighboring butcher shop were turned into a bar in 1995. It hosts a variety of musical acts, although punk and hard rock bands tend to be most common. Local acts usually play at the venue, while their slightly "hipster" clientele often stay within the confines of the separate bar area.

In the early 2000s, the venue hosted a popular all-ages matinee on Saturday afternoons, which was created and hosted by Lower East Side glam-punk band The Act.

References

External links 

Official Website
Facebook
Twitter
Instagram
"Arlene's Grocery," NYC.com

Drinking establishments in Manhattan
Music venues in Manhattan
Nightlife in New York City
Rock music venues
1995 establishments in New York City
Grocery store buildings